The News Agency of Nigeria (NAN) is a news reporting agency owned and run by the Federal Government of Nigeria just like Nigerian Television Authority. NAN was formed in part to disseminate news easily across the country and to the international community and also as a means to counter negative stories about Nigeria.

On 10 May 1976, a decree establishing the agency was promulgated into law but its operations began two years after. In March 1978, a board of directors was inaugurated while on 2 October 1978 pilot news operations began.

NAN provides General News Service to subscribers in three bulletins published daily. The agency's website www.nannews.ng (formerly www.nan.ng) was launched on 8 August 2016, to offer news to the worldwide audience interested in news primarily about Nigeria, Africa's most populated country. 

In 2019, NAN signed a content-sharing agreement with Xinhua News Agency. 

The agency has a network of reporters covering all the states of the federation proving to be a valuable source of news reports published by regional and national newspapers who lack a country wide coverage. Access to news is subject to premium subscription.

NAN Retirement Age 

NAN's Managing Director Bayo Onanuga has called for the extension of retirement age for journalists in the public service from 60 years to 70 years. Onanuga made this call in Abuja while speaking at a retirement ceremony organized for Deputy Editor-in-Chief with the agency. According to him, journalists become more experienced as they grow older on the job, and therefore, urged the relevant unions to take up the matter with the relevant authorities. The retirement age for journalists should be extended to 70 years, so that they can still contribute to their industry

References

External links

1976 establishments in Nigeria
Government of Nigeria
News agencies based in Nigeria
Organizations established in 1976